The 1995–96 NBA season was the 50th season of the National Basketball Association (NBA), though the 50th anniversary was not celebrated until the following season. The Chicago Bulls defeated the Seattle SuperSonics 4 games to 2 in the NBA Finals to win their fourth championship.

1995 NBA lockout
The 1995 NBA lockout was the first lockout of four in the history of the NBA. When the previous collective bargaining agreement expired after the 1993–94 season, a no-strike, no-lockout agreement was made in October 1994, with a moratorium on signing or restructuring player contracts. That moratorium expired on June 15, 1995, one day after the NBA Finals concluded. The expansion draft (which was held on June 24) and the NBA draft  (which was held on June 28) were allowed to take place, but all other league business, including trades, free-agent signings, contract extensions, and summer leagues were suspended 
from July 1 until September 12; no games were lost due to the lockout, as a new collective bargaining agreement was reached well before the start of the 1995–96 season.
Among the key issues in the labor dispute were the salary cap, free agency, a rookie salary cap, and revenue sharing.

Notable occurrences

The NBA established its first Canadian teams since the 1946–47 Toronto Huskies, as the Toronto Raptors and the Vancouver Grizzlies made their debuts as the NBA's 28th and 29th franchises. The Grizzlies began play at GM Place (now Rogers Arena) as a member of the Midwest Division while the Raptors set up shop at the SkyDome (now Rogers Centre), with some games also played at Maple Leaf Gardens, as a member of the Central Division. Each franchise won its first game, although Toronto would win only 21 games in the season, and Vancouver 15 games.
The Chicago Bulls finished the season with a combined regular season and postseason record of 87–13, the best in NBA history. Chicago's 72 wins remained an NBA record until , when the Golden State Warriors, who were coached by ex-Bulls guard Steve Kerr, posted a 73–9 record, despite winning a combined 88 regular season and postseason games, they failed to win the championship. Prior to the start of the NBA Playoffs, the Bulls shocked the basketball world by wearing black socks, claiming this as redemption to the city's most infamous sports moment, the Black Sox Scandal of 1919. The socks would become a Bulls playoff tradition, which other teams soon follow. However, this was not the first time a team or a particular player wore black socks; earlier in the season, Orlando Magic forward Dennis Scott wore black socks while competing in the AT&T Three-Point Shootout at NBA All-Star Weekend.
The Miami Heat hired Pat Riley as the team's new head coach and president of basketball operations. Riley's first moves were the acquisition of Alonzo Mourning from the Charlotte Hornets for Glen Rice, and the trade for Tim Hardaway from the Golden State Warriors for Kevin Willis. Hardaway and Mourning would turn the struggling Heat into contenders in the coming seasons.
NBA debuts for four future All-Stars Kevin Garnett, Michael Finley, Rasheed Wallace and Jerry Stackhouse. Toronto Raptors point guard Damon Stoudamire won Rookie of the Year. 
Michael Jordan became the only player to win the NBA Finals MVP Award at least four times. He would also become the second player to earn the MVP trophy since Willis Reed in 1970, having won All-Star, Regular Season and Finals MVP in the same season; an achievement he also accomplished in 1998, and later on by Shaquille O'Neal in 2000.
Michael Jordan won his NBA record 8th scoring title.
The Boston Celtics played their first season at the FleetCenter (now TD Garden).
The 1996 NBA All-Star Game was played at the Alamodome in San Antonio, with the East defeating the West 129–118. Michael Jordan of the Chicago Bulls was named the game's MVP. Los Angeles Clippers guard Brent Barry won the Slam Dunk Contest. 
Referees were locked out to begin the season, but reached an agreement to return to work in December 1995. 
Following the referee lockout, legendary official Jake O'Donnell retired after 27 seasons (1968–95). O'Donnell, who also was an American League umpire from 1968 to 1971, worked the NBA Finals for 23 consecutive years (1972 through 1994). He remains the only official to work all-star games in two major professional sports. 
Magic Johnson comes out of retirement to play in 32 games for Los Angeles before retiring again at the end of the season.
The Philadelphia 76ers play their final season at The Spectrum. At the time, it was named the CoreStates Spectrum; the CoreStates name was later added on their future home arena under construction at the time. The 76ers would return to the renamed Wachovia Spectrum for a farewell game in the 2008–09 season before its eventual demolition. 
Hakeem Olajuwon passed Kareem Abdul-Jabbar as the all-time leader in blocked shots in the last game of the season. John Stockton also became the all-time steals and assists leader, passing Maurice Cheeks and Magic Johnson, respectively. Robert Parish also passed Abdul-Jabbar for the most games played in the NBA.
Portland Trail Blazers' longest sellout streak by any team in professional sports ends at 814, during which the team played its first season at higher-capacity Rose Garden, now the Moda Center.
The Sacramento Kings made their first playoff appearance since 1986.

1995–96 NBA changes
 The Atlanta Hawks changed their logo and uniforms, which featured the Hawks' logo on the front of the jerseys. The road jerseys were both red and black.
 The Boston Celtics moved into the FleetCenter.
 The Chicago Bulls got new black alternate uniforms with pinstripes.
 The Houston Rockets changed their logo and uniforms, adding pinstripes to their jerseys and navy to their color scheme.
 The Miami Heat added new red alternate uniforms.
 The Milwaukee Bucks added new green alternate uniforms.
 The New York Knicks added the "New York" script to their logo, and got new blue alternate uniforms, with black side panels on their jerseys.
 The Portland Trail Blazers moved into the Rose Garden.
 The Seattle SuperSonics changed their logo and uniforms, replacing their primary green and yellow colors with dark green and red with side panels on their jerseys.
 The expansion Toronto Raptors got a new logo and new pinstripe uniforms, adding purple and red to their color scheme.
 The expansion Vancouver Grizzlies got a new logo and new uniforms, adding teal and brown to their color scheme.

Final standings

By division

By conference

Notes
z – Clinched home court advantage for the entire playoffs
c – Clinched home court advantage for the conference playoffs
y – Clinched division title 
x – Clinched playoff spot

Playoffs
Teams in bold advanced to the next round. The numbers to the left of each team indicate the team's seeding in its conference, and the numbers to the right indicate the number of games the team won in that round. The division champions are marked by an asterisk. Home court advantage does not necessarily belong to the higher-seeded team, but instead the team with the better regular season record; teams enjoying the home advantage are shown in italics.

Statistics leaders

NBA awards

Yearly awards
 NBA Most Valuable Player: Michael Jordan, Chicago Bulls
 NBA Rookie of the Year: Damon Stoudamire, Toronto Raptors
 NBA Defensive Player of the Year: Gary Payton, Seattle SuperSonics
 Sixth Man of the Year: Toni Kukoč, Chicago Bulls
 NBA Most Improved Player: Gheorghe Mureșan, Washington Bullets
 NBA Coach of the Year: Phil Jackson, Chicago Bulls

All-NBA First Team:
F – Karl Malone, Utah Jazz
F – Scottie Pippen, Chicago Bulls
C – David Robinson, San Antonio Spurs
G – Michael Jordan, Chicago Bulls
G – Penny Hardaway, Orlando Magic

 All-NBA Second Team:
 F – Shawn Kemp, Seattle SuperSonics
 F – Grant Hill, Detroit Pistons
 C – Hakeem Olajuwon, Houston Rockets
 G – Gary Payton, Seattle SuperSonics
 G – John Stockton, Utah Jazz

 All-NBA Third Team:
 F – Charles Barkley, Phoenix Suns
 F – Juwan Howard, Washington Bullets
 C – Shaquille O'Neal, Orlando Magic
 G – Mitch Richmond, Sacramento Kings
 G – Reggie Miller, Indiana Pacers

 NBA All-Defensive First Team:
 F – Dennis Rodman, Chicago Bulls
 F – Scottie Pippen, Chicago Bulls
 C – David Robinson, San Antonio Spurs
 G – Michael Jordan, Chicago Bulls
 G – Gary Payton, Seattle SuperSonics

 NBA All-Defensive Second Team:
 F – Horace Grant, Orlando Magic
 F – Derrick McKey, Indiana Pacers
 C – Hakeem Olajuwon, Houston Rockets
 G – Bobby Phills, Cleveland Cavaliers
 G – Mookie Blaylock, Atlanta Hawks

NBA All-Rookie First Team:
 Damon Stoudamire, Toronto Raptors
 Joe Smith, Golden State Warriors
 Jerry Stackhouse, Philadelphia 76ers
 Antonio McDyess, Denver Nuggets
 Arvydas Sabonis, Portland Trail Blazers
 Michael Finley, Phoenix Suns

 All-NBA Rookie Second Team:
 Rasheed Wallace, Washington Bullets
 Kevin Garnett, Minnesota Timberwolves
 Bryant Reeves, Vancouver Grizzlies
 Brent Barry, Los Angeles Clippers
 Tyus Edney, Sacramento Kings

Player of the week
The following players were named NBA Player of the Week.

Player of the month
The following players were named NBA Player of the Month.

Rookie of the month
The following players were named NBA Rookie of the Month.

Coach of the month
The following coaches were named NBA Coach of the Month.

References

 
 
1995–96 in Canadian basketball